is a Japanese journalist who works for NHK. During his career, he was presenter of NHK News 7 and NHK News 21.

References

External links
 NHK Sendai profile 

1958 births
Living people
Japanese journalists
NHK
Japanese television presenters
Japanese broadcast news analysts